Julie Kent may refer to:

Julie Kent (diver) (born 1965), retired Australian diver
Julie Kent (dancer) (born 1969), American ballet dancer
Julie Kent (sociologist) (born 1957), of the School of Humanities, Languages and Social Sciences (UWE)

See also
Julia Kent, cellist